Azteca aurita is a species of ant in the genus Azteca. Described by Emery in 1893, the species is widespread in North America and South America.

References

Azteca (genus)
Hymenoptera of North America
Hymenoptera of South America
Insects described in 1893